Darline Radamaker (born 16 April 1999) is an American-raised Haitian footballer who plays as a midfielder for the Grand Valley State Lakers. She has been a member of the Haiti women's national team. She is nicknamed the "Haitian Marta" due to her adroit dribbling. She is widely expected to be a key player for the Haiti U-20 Women's National Team as it attempts to qualify for the 2016 FIFA U-20 Women's World Cup.

References

1999 births
Living people
Women's association football midfielders
Haitian women's footballers
People from Les Cayes
Haiti women's international footballers
Haitian emigrants to the United States
Naturalized citizens of the United States
American adoptees
American women's soccer players
Soccer players from Michigan
Sportspeople from Sterling Heights, Michigan
African-American women's soccer players
American sportspeople of Haitian descent
Grand Valley State Lakers athletes
21st-century African-American sportspeople
21st-century African-American women